Broussard is a surname of French origin. 

People with the surname include:

Aaron Broussard (born 1949), American politician
Allen Broussard (1929–1996), American jurist
Alley Broussard (born 1983), American football player
Ben Broussard (born 1976), American baseball player
Bruce D. Broussard, American businessman
Carroll Broussard, American basketball player
Chris Broussard (born 1968), American sports analyst
Edwin S. Broussard (1874–1934), American politician
Fred Broussard (born 1933), American football player
George Broussard, American video game producer
Hugues Broussard (born 1934), French swimmer
Israel Broussard (born 1994), American actor
Jamall Broussard (born 1981), American football player
Joseph Broussard (1702–1765), Acadian leader
Joseph Eloi Broussard (1866–1956), American miller
Marc Broussard (born 1982), American singer
Meredith Broussard, American academic
Paul Broussard (1964–1991), American murder victim
Philippe Broussard (born 1963), French journalist
Ray Broussard (1937–1993), American jockey
Rebecca Broussard (born 1963), American actress and model
Robert F. Broussard (1864–1918), American politician
Steve Broussard (born 1967), American football running back and coach
Steve Broussard (punter) (born 1957), American football punter
Tess Broussard (born 1972), American actress and model
Trina Broussard (born 1969), American singer

Fictional characters 
Eric Broussard, in the television series Colony

See also
Boussard, surname
Brussaard, surname

French-language surnames